Vashchuk is a surname. Notable people with the surname include:

 Oksana Vashchuk (born 1989), Ukrainian sport wrestler
 Olha Vashchuk (born 1987), Ukrainian handball player
 Vladyslav Vashchuk (born 1975), Ukrainian footballer

See also
 

Ukrainian-language surnames